Milan Vukadinov (Serbian Cyrillic: Милан Вукадинов; 1936–2002) was a Serbian-Canadian chess player who represented Canada at the 24th Chess Olympiad in Valletta, Malta.Canada came eight to ninth place in the field of 81 countries competing for the world chess championship. In the final results, Russia took gold, Hungary silver and Yugoslavia bronze medals.

Biography
Vukadinov was born in Voyvodina in 1936, which was part of Yugoslavia at the time. Vukadinov first learned to play chess from his Serbian father at the age of nine in his hometown in Banat, Serbia. However, he did not participate in a tournament until age 20. He attended the University of Belgrade, where he studied law while working as a security guard part-time. Following this, he moved to Germany. In 1965, Vukadinov emigrated to Canada. He received a Master's degree from the University of Waterloo in 1971.

In Canada, Vukadinov began participating in the Windsor Chess Club. He was known primarily as a chess coach. An early tournament result had him finish in second place at the Ontario Open in 1967. In London, he played 74 people in a simultaneous exhibition, winning 72 games. In 1980, he represented Canada at the 24th Chess Olympiad in Valletta, Malta, where the team set a record for the best Canadian Chess Olympiad results, with eighth to ninth place out of 81.

At his peak, Vukadinov had a Chess Federation of Canada rating of 2412, the eighth-highest Canadian rating. His United States Chess Federation rating peaked at 2455 and his FIDE rating 2232.

Vukadinov died of a brain tumor in Windsor on 13 November 2002.

See also
 List of Serbian Canadians
 Serbian Canadians

References 

1936 births
2002 deaths
People from the Banat
Serbian chess players
20th-century chess players
Canadian people of Serbian descent